The Pirus are an alliance of street gangs (known as "sets"), under the larger Bloods alliance.

Etymology 
The name "Piru" is derived from the Piru Street Boys, a gang which was founded in 1969 by Sylvester Scott and Vincent Owens in Compton. The Piru Street Boys are considered the forerunners to the Bloods, which is why the terms "Piru" and "Blood" are often used interchangeably. However, this interchangeable use of the terms is inaccurate, as many non-Piru gangs such as the Denver Lanes and Brims were also instrumental in the formation of the Bloods.

Furthermore, the Pirus have been described as an alliance of street gangs within the larger Bloods alliance, meaning that not all Bloods sets will identify as "Pirus".

History 
In 1969, a gang called the Piru Street Boys was founded by Sylvester Scott and Vincent Owens. According to some sources, the Piru Street Boys were initially associated with the Crips, but later had a falling out. However, other sources dispute any alliance, claiming that the Piru Street Boys were victimised by the Crips. Nevertheless, by 1972, the Piru Street Boys formed an alliance with other smaller street gangs such as the Brims, Bishops and Denver Lanes, which also opposed the Crips. This alliance became known as the Bloods, as the members of this alliance called each other "blood".

Eventually, more Piru sets would form. There are 15 known Piru sets within the Greater Los Angeles area. Piru sets have fought against each other. For example, the alleged shooter of Biggie Smalls, a Mob Piru named Wardell Fouse, was reportedly killed by members of the Fruit Town Piru in 2003.

Piru sets 

 Mob Piru
 Westside Piru
 Fruit Town Piru
 Leuders Park Piru
 Lime Hood Piru
 Elm Street Piru
 Tree Top Piru 
 Cedar Block Piru
 Avenue Piru  
 Holly Hood Piru
 Neighborhood Piru
 Skyline Piru
 151 Piru
 145 Piru
 Campanella Park Piru
 Cross Atlantic Piru
 Village Town Piru
 135 Piru
 Eastside Piru
 Circle City Piru
 Pacoima Piru
 Hawthorne Piru
 Scottz Dale Piru
 Valley Hi Piru

In popular culture 

 The song Piru Love on Bangin' on Wax (1993) by Bloods & Crips makes references to various Piru sets, including Holly Hood, Elm Street and Leuders Park.

See also
 African-American organized crime
 Gangs in Los Angeles
 List of California street gangs

References 

Organizations established in 1969
1969 establishments in California
Bloods sets
African-American history in Los Angeles
Compton, California